B34  may refer to:
 Avia B-34, a biplane fighter aircraft built in Czechoslovakia in the early 1930s
 Sicilian Defence, Accelerated Dragon, Encyclopaedia of Chess Openings code
 Lockheed Ventura B-34 Lexington, a bomber and patrol aircraft of World War II, used by United States and British Commonwealth forces
 Unterseeboot B-34, a German Type UB II submarine of the German Imperial Navy during World War I